This list is a subsection of the List of members of the National Academy of Sciences, which includes approximately 2,000 current (not past) members and 350 foreign associates of the United States National Academy of Sciences, each of whom is affiliated with one of 31 disciplinary sections. Each person's name, primary institution, and election year are given. This list does not include deceased members.

Animal, nutritional, and applied microbial sciences

References
http://www.nasonline.org members elected as of 2004
https://archive.today/20060427165936/http://www4.nationalacademies.org/news.nsf/isbn/04252006?OpenDocument Members elected in 2006